Edward William Madjeski (born Edward William Majewski on July 20, 1908) was an American professional baseball catcher. He played all or part of four seasons in Major League Baseball (MLB), from 1932 through 1937, for the Philadelphia Athletics, Chicago White Sox, and New York Giants. He also spent several years in the minors as a manager, although only one of those was a complete season: 1946 with the Orlando Senators of the Florida State League.

In 166 games over four seasons, Madjeski posted a .241 batting average (116-for-481) with 58 runs, 5 home runs and 56 RBI.

External links

Major League Baseball catchers
Philadelphia Athletics players
Chicago White Sox players
New York Giants (NL) players
York White Roses players
Harrisburg Senators players
Kansas City Blues (baseball) players
Jersey City Giants players
Louisville Colonels (minor league) players
Wilkes-Barre Barons (baseball) players
Minor league baseball managers
Baseball players from New York (state)
1908 births
1994 deaths